Words & Music: John Mellencamp's Greatest Hits is a greatest hits album by American rock and roll artist John Mellencamp. This two-disc set was released October 19, 2004 on the Island and UTV Records labels. It is a retrospective of Mellencamp's career at the time of its release, and features at least one song from each of his studio albums released between 1978's A Biography and 2003's Trouble No More. Two songs, "Walk Tall" and "Thank You", were recorded exclusively for this album. No songs from Mellencamp's 1976 debut album Chestnut Street Incident or 1977's The Kid Inside are represented. Also omitted is Mellencamp's cover of "Without Expression", which was released on his previous compilation album The Best That I Could Do 1978–1988.

Initial pressings of the album included a bonus DVD that contained the music videos for "Crumblin' Down", "R.O.C.K. in the U.S.A.", "Rain on the Scarecrow", "Check It Out", and "Key West Intermezzo (I Saw You First)".

AllMusic's Stephen Thomas Erlewine gave the compilation a positive review, describing it as more thorough than The Best That I Could Do 1978–1988, but criticized its non-chronological track listing.

In December 2004 the album was certified Platinum by the RIAA.

Track listing
All songs written by John Mellencamp, except where noted.

Disc one
 "Walk Tall" – 3:45
(previously unreleased)
 "Pink Houses" – 4:45
(from Uh-Huh, 1983)
 "Lonely Ol' Night" – 3:46
(from Scarecrow, 1985)
 "Jackie Brown" – 4:03
(from Big Daddy, 1989)
 "Rain on the Scarecrow" (Mellencamp, George M. Green) – 3:46
(from Scarecrow, 1985)
 "Love and Happiness" – 3:54
(from Whenever We Wanted, 1991)
 "Check It Out" – 4:21
(from The Lonesome Jubilee, 1987)
 "Peaceful World" – 4:06
(from Cuttin' Heads, 2001)
 "Paper in Fire" – 3:52
(from The Lonesome Jubilee, 1987)
 "Your Life Is Now" (Mellencamp, Green) – 3:59
(from John Mellencamp, 1998)
 "Human Wheels" (Mellencamp, Green) – 5:36
(from Human Wheels, 1993)
 "When Jesus Left Birmingham" – 5:16
(from Human Wheels, 1993)
 "Authority Song" – 3:50
(from Uh-Huh, 1983)
 "What If I Came Knocking" – 5:06
(from Human Wheels, 1993)
 "Crumblin' Down" (Mellencamp, Green) – 3:36
(from Uh-Huh, 1983)
 "Small Town" – 3:42
(from Scarecrow, 1985)
 "R.O.C.K. in the U.S.A." – 2:55
(from Scarecrow, 1985)
 "Cherry Bomb" – 4:49
(from The Lonesome Jubilee, 1987)
 "Pop Singer" – 2:46
(from Big Daddy, 1989)

Disc two
 "Thank You" – 3:38
(previously unreleased)
 "Martha Say" – 3:43
(from Big Daddy, 1989)
 "Key West Intermezzo (I Saw You First)" (Mellencamp, Green) – 4:54
(from Mr. Happy Go Lucky, 1996)
 "Hand to Hold On to" – 3:25
(from American Fool, 1982)
 "I Need a Lover" – 5:36
(from A Biography, 1978 & John Cougar, 1979)
 "Hurts So Good" (Mellencamp, Green) – 3:41
(from American Fool, 1982)
 "Get a Leg Up" – 3:47
(from Whenever We Wanted, 1991)
 "Wild Night" (Van Morrison) – 3:28
(from Dance Naked, 1994)
 "Dance Naked" – 3:01
(from Dance Naked, 1994)
 "Teardrops Will Fall" (David Allard, Marion Smith) – 4:20
(from Trouble No More, 2003)
 "Ain't Even Done with the Night" – 4:38
(from Nothin' Matters and What If It Did, 1980)
 "Just Another Day" – 3:31
(from Mr. Happy Go Lucky, 1996)
 "Jack & Diane" – 4:17
(from American Fool, 1982)
 "Rumbleseat" – 2:59
(from Scarecrow, 1985)
 "I'm Not Running Anymore" – 3:27
(from John Mellencamp, 1998)
 "Again Tonight" – 3:18
(from Whenever We Wanted, 1991)
 "This Time" – 4:20
(from Nothin' Matters and What If It Did, 1980)
 "Now More Than Ever" – 3:43
(from Whenever We Wanted, 1991)

Personnel on 2004 tracks

"Walk Tall"
John Mellencamp – lead vocals
Kenneth "Babyface" Edmonds – guitar, background vocals
Reggie Hamilton – bass
Ricky Lawson – drums
Michael Ramos – organ
Miriam Sturm – violin
Andy York – guitar

"Thank You"
John Mellencamp – lead vocals
Kenneth "Babyface" Edmonds – guitar, background vocals
Ricky Lawson – drums
Michael Ramos – organ, background vocals
Miriam Sturm – violin
Mike Wanchic – guitar, background vocals
Andy York – guitar, background vocals
Jane McLeod – background vocals
Sonja Rasmussen – background vocals
Laurie Robert-Glug – background vocals
Susan Swaney – background vocals

Charts

References

External links
 John Mellencamp's official website

2004 greatest hits albums
Albums produced by Don Gehman
Albums produced by Malcolm Burn
John Mellencamp compilation albums
Island Records compilation albums